Beta Kappa was a Social Fraternity founded at Hamline University in 1901, which merged with Theta Chi in 1942.

Development
Eventually this somewhat unwieldy name was colloquially shortened to Beta Kappa (date?), maturing into a local fraternity that continued for twenty-one years before beginning a period of rapid expansion. 

Founders honored by the fraternity are 
 Daniel Paul Rader
 Edward T. Marlatte
 Albert T. Spencer
 Charles H. Wallace

In 1922, Beta chapter at the University of Washington was formed, and in quick succession it established over 40 chapters with a total membership of over 5,000.

Traditions and Heritage
The fraternity magazine was The Journal of Beta Kappa 

The Fraternity's colors were Purple and Gold. Its flower was the Red Templar Rose. The badge was in the shape of a diamond in black enamel, longer from top to bottom, with 24 pearls on its perimeter. It held a small, white circular disk in the center, on this a coiled serpent above a lamp and below were two crossed swords.

Merger
The mother chapter at Hamline University was granted the chapter name, Beta Kappa chapter to honor its rank as a former Alpha chapter. The merger added 17 new chapters to Theta Chi, and two Beta Kappa chapters were merged into existing chapters.

Chapter List
The chapters of Beta Kappa were as follows.  Chapters noted in bold were active at the time of the merger, with dormant chapters in italics.  A few chapters that were active but did not merge (with ) are also in bold:

See also
Theta Chi

References

Defunct former members of the North American Interfraternity Conference
Theta Chi
Student organizations established in 1901
1901 establishments in Minnesota